The Scourger is a thrash metal band from Helsinki, Finland, that formed in 2003. All three of the band's singles have landed on the national Finnish charts: "Hatehead", which debuted at No. 1 in July 2005; "Maximum Intensity", which landed at No. 3 a year later and climbed to No. 2 the following week; and "Never Bury the Hatchet", which entered the charts at No. 9 in July 2007. The first two singles are found on the band's 2006 debut album, Blind Date with Violence, while the third single is on the 2008 follow-up, Dark Invitation to Armageddon. On May 14, 2009, the band announced that it was splitting; vocalist Jari Hurskainen retained The Scourger name, while drummer Seppo Tarvainen, bassist Kimmo Kammonen, and guitarists Jani Luttinen and Antti Wirman will form a new band which has not yet been officially announced. The reason for the split was not given. Hurskainen announced the addition of three new members the following year: Jani Hentilä and Tero Kemppainen on guitars and Jape Nummenpää on bass.

Band members

Current members
Jari Hurskainen – vocals
Jani Hentilä – guitars
Tero Kemppainen – guitars
Jape Nummenpää - bass

Former members
Pekka Hämäläinen – guitars
Timo Nyberg – guitars
Harri Hytönen – guitars
Seppo Tarvainen – drums
Jani Luttinen – guitars
Antti Wirman – guitars
Kimmo Kammonen – bass

Session musicians
Alec Hirst-Gee – bass
Kirka Sainio – bass

Discography

EPs
To the Slayground (2005)

Studio albums
Blind Date with Violence (2006)
Dark Invitation to Armageddon (2008)

References

External links
 Official website

Finnish thrash metal musical groups
Musical groups established in 2003